Epitriche is a genus of flowering plants in the family Asteraceae.

There is only one known species, Epitriche demissus, endemic to Western Australia.

References

Endemic flora of Australia
Monotypic Asteraceae genera
Gnaphalieae
Taxa named by Nikolai Turczaninow
Plants described in 1851